The 2015 Champions Indoor Football season was the first season of the CIF. The new league was the result of a merger between the Lone Star Football League and the Champions Professional Indoor Football League. The regular season began on Saturday, February 28 and finished on Saturday, June 6.  The league champion was the Sioux City Bandits, who defeated the Texas Revolution 76-61 in Champions Bowl I. The season MVP was Charles Dowdell of the Sioux City Bandits, and the Champions Bowl MVP was Drew Prohaska, also of the Bandits.

Standings

Playoffs

References

External links
 Official website